Auma is a surname of Ugandan origin. Notable people with the surname include:
Alice Auma, Ugandan politician
Alex Auma (born 1987), Kenyan cricketer
Hellen Auma Wandera (born 1996), Ugandan cricketer
Linda Agnes Auma, Ugandan politician and legislator

Surnames of Ugandan origin